The 15th Pan-American Games were held in Rio de Janeiro, Brazil, between 13 July 2007 and 29 July 2007.

Medals

Bronze

Men's 200m Individual Medley: Bradley Ally

External links
Rio 2007 Official website

Nations at the 2007 Pan American Games
P
2007